Fabula is a literary award in Slovenia awarded each year for the best collection of short prose in Slovene published in the previous two years. It has been bestowed since 2006 by the national newspaper house Dnevnik at the Fabula World Literatures festival that takes place every spring in Ljubljana. The winner also receives a financial award.

References

External links
 Fabula World Literatures festival site

 
Slovenian literary awards
Awards established in 2006